Patrick Gower (born 1976/1977) is a New Zealand political journalist and National Correspondent for Newshub (formerly called 3 News). Prior to his current role he was Newshub's political editor.

Early life
Gower grew up in New Plymouth where his father was a fitter and turner at a power station, and his mother was a doctor's receptionist. He had a Roman Catholic upbringing and schooling, having attended St Joseph's Catholic School and Francis Douglas Memorial College.

He has a BA with honours in politics from Victoria University of Wellington, choosing the university because it was near Parliament. While he attended Victoria University he got involved in Salient magazine. After finishing his politics degree, he studied journalism at Auckland University of Technology.

Journalism career
Gower started his journalism career working the graveyard shift (6pm–1:30am) at The New Zealand Herald, later becoming one of the newspaper's two police reporters. He subsequently moved to the UK and worked at Jane's Police Review. Once back in New Zealand he worked again at the Herald, covering politics and working under Audrey Young.

Later he made the move to television journalism and began working at 3 News, where he was initially a political reporter. He has said that the transition involved a big change in reporting styles:

He took over as political editor of 3 News from Duncan Garner in November 2012. 

Despite controversy about political bias on social networking sites, Gower claims to be a non-voter on the grounds of impartiality, stating:
In 2018, after five years as Newshub's political editor, he shifted roles to become its national correspondent.

Viral skit
In December 2014, a clip of Gower swearing on what appeared to be live television went viral. In the video, a library-goer stands up and says, "This is a fucking library!", to which Gower replies, "This is the fuckin' news." A remix of the video later went viral. The incident was part of a law school revue skit.

Cannabis documentary 
In 2019, Gower featured in a two part documentary series Patrick Gower: On Weed where he explored issues related to medicinal and recreational cannabis in advance of the 2020 New Zealand cannabis referendum. The documentary, produced by Three and funded by NZ on Air, was filmed in New Zealand and the United States. A final third episode was released in September 2020, in advance of the referendum which had been delayed due to the COVID-19 pandemic.

They Are Us script
In July 2021, Gower broke the story on a leaked draft script of the controversial They Are Us movie, which was based on the Christchurch mosque shootings. The proposed script was criticised by members of the New Zealand Muslim community as well as several politicians including National Party leader Simon Bridges, ACT Party David Seymour, and former Deputy Prime Minister Winston Peters for its depiction of graphic violence, exploitation of the tragedy for commercial gain, and historical inaccuracies of the events relating to the mosque shootings. Gower was emotionally affected by the script and called upon the film's director and writer Andrew Niccol to withdraw from the film production.

Personal life
Gower lives in Wellington and has two children.

See also
 List of New Zealand television personalities

References

External links
 Profile, newshub.co.nz 
 Youtube channel
  Patrick Gower admits man crush on Donald Trump's son in weird live video from RNC, stuff.co.nz

1970s births
Victoria University of Wellington alumni
Living people
People from New Plymouth
Auckland University of Technology alumni
People educated at Francis Douglas Memorial College
20th-century New Zealand journalists
21st-century New Zealand journalists